"Big Love" is a Lindsey Buckingham song, performed by British-American rock band Fleetwood Mac. The song first appeared on the band's 1987 album Tango in the Night. The song was the first single to be released from the album, reaching number 5 in the US and number nine in the UK. The single was also a hit on the American dance charts, where the song peaked at number 7.

A 12-inch version featured an extended dance mix, with added vocals by Stevie Nicks. While the 12-inch version in some territories included "You & I, Part II" from the Tango in the Night album, the 7-inch version and 12-inch version in other territories included a non-album track, "You & I, Part I". A limited edition 12-inch picture disc was released in the UK, as well as a double 7-inch pack that included the "Big Love" single, and an exclusive 7-inch featuring "The Chain" as an A-side. "Big Love" became a standard of the Balearic beat dance sound, and the object of an extended remix by the DJ Arthur Baker.

Background
"Big Love" was written by Lindsey Buckingham for a third solo album that he began in 1985, which instead became Fleetwood Mac's Tango in the Night. The song was nearly complete by the time Fleetwood Mac began work on Tango in the Night, so the band largely left Buckingham's demo untouched for the final release. Buckingham performed the oh-ah vocals himself by sampling his voice. "It was odd," he said, "that so many people wondered if it was Stevie on there with me."

Reception
Cash Box called it a "perfect blend of rock experimentation and pure pop sensibility."

Music video
The video opens on a shot of a mansion. Then the camera slowly pans back and continues to pan back nonstop throughout the video as Buckingham sings with the band featured playing instruments in various settings while Nicks dances around wearing different outfits during the video. During the last segment of the song, the video is then played backwards in a fast forwarded sort of form.

Solo version
After Buckingham left Fleetwood Mac in 1987 (shortly after Tango in the Night was released), the band did not perform "Big Love" live until his return in 1997. It was in 1993, on his first solo tour, that Buckingham performed a guitar-only version of the song. When Buckingham played "Big Love" live, he used a gutted Gibson Chet Atkins SST with a capo on the fourth fret and a synth pickup. In 1997, he performed "Big Love" in the same style on Fleetwood Mac's live album The Dance. The song also appeared on the second volume of Cameron Crowe's Elizabethtown film soundtrack. Buckingham continues to perform the song on solo tours as well as Fleetwood Mac tours.

Track listings

UK 7" single (Warner Brothers Records W 8398)
"Big Love"  – 3:37
"You and I, Part I" – 3:09

UK 12" single (Warner Brothers Records W 8398 T)
"Big Love" (Extended Remix) – 6:42
"You and I, Part I" – 3:09

US 12" single (Warner Brothers Records 0-20683)
"Big Love" (Extended Remix) – 6:42
"Big Love" (House on the Hill Dub) – 3:03
"Big Love" (Piano Dub) – 6:36
"You and I, Part II" – 2:40

Personnel
 Lindsey Buckingham – vocals, guitars, bass guitar, Fairlight CMI, synthesizer, drum and percussion programming
 Mick Fleetwood – drums
 Stevie Nicks – vocals (12" single extended remix only)

Charts

Weekly charts

Year-end charts

Certifications

References

1987 singles
Fleetwood Mac songs
Songs written by Lindsey Buckingham
Song recordings produced by Richard Dashut
Warner Records singles